Sirsalgarh is a small village in Bagpat district, Uttar Pradesh, India, famous for its Garh, a hill of soil created due to earthquake a century before.

History
SirsalGarh was established a century before because of an earthquake.
Sirsalgarh is a small village but has produced intellectual people Scientist, Professors, Teachers and Computer Engineers.

Population 
This village has 920 houses and a population of 6,397.

Panchayat
Its panchayat comes under the Sirsalgarh-Darkawada Panchayat.
 District: Baghpat
 Block:  BINAULI
 Gram Panchayat: SIRSALGARH DARKAVDA

Climate 
Climate here is warm and cool

Geography

SirsalGarh is one of the village of district Bagpat in Uttar Pradesh. The village is Located 25 km. in East of bank of river Yamuna at 29.096527’ North Latitude and 77.40263’ East Longitude. It is 40 km from Meerut City and 20 km. from Bagpat. In the East of this village a small town Barnawa famous from the ancient time of Mahabharata for the burning of Laksha-grah.

Education
Only a single primary school is there. Despite that this small village has produced scientists, professors, teacher, doctors, officers and computer engineers, . Prominent names among  are Dr. Ragbir Singh (Professor), Dr. Om Vir Singh (Scientist), Dr. Pooran Singh (Professor), Sh. Yogendra Ujjwal (Agriculture officer), Sh. Gulbir Singh (Agriculture officer), Sh. Prahalad Singh (Horticulture Inspector), Sh. Ramesh Chand (Irrigation Inspector), Sh. Surendra Singh (Teacher), Sh. Vinod Kumar (Principal of Govt. Inter College),  Sh. Parmod Kumar  alias Amit (Computer Engineer, London), Sh, Lokesh Kumar (Electronic Engineers) and many others.

References 
Bagpat.Nic.in
http://censusindia.gov.in/PopulationFinder/Sub_Districts_Master.aspx?state_code=09&district_code=08

External links
 Google Map Location here

Villages in Bagpat district